The naval Battle of Reval took place on 13 May 1790 (2 May OS) during the Russo-Swedish War (1788-1790), off the port of Reval (now Tallinn, Estonia).

Origins 
Undaunted by the Swedish defeats and failures during 1789, the Swedish king, Gustav III sent the battle fleet under his brother Prince Karl, Duke of Södermanland, to eliminate Admiral Chichagov's Russian squadron, which had wintered in the harbor at Reval.

General-Admiral Duke Karl approached Reval with 26 ships of the line and large frigates mounting a combined 1,680 cannon. Chichagov, preparing to meet the enemy in the harbour, formed a battle line made up of 9 ships of the line and the frigate Venus.

Battle

The Russian fleet (9 ships of the line, 5 frigates) was anchored in a line going from Reval harbour towards the Viimsi (Wims) peninsula. The first line consisted of nine ships of the line and frigates (the 100-gun battleships Rostislav and Saratov, 74-gun Kir Ioann, Mstislav, Sv. Yelena and Yaroslav, 66-gun Pobedonosets, Boleslav and Izyaslav and the 40-gun frigate Venus). In the second line, four frigates - Podrazhislav (32 guns), Slava (32), Nadezhda Blagopoluchiya (32) and Pryamislav (36). Two bomb-vessels were deployed on the flanks. The third line was composed of seven launches.

The Swedish fleet under the command of General-Admiral Duke Karl of Södermanland consisted of 22 ships of the line, four frigates and four smaller vessels. It entered the harbour and started passing by the anchored Russian ships.

Due to strong winds and inaccurate aiming, most Swedish projectiles ricocheted past their targets, while the Russian ships that were anchored within the protected area of the harbour were able to use their guns much more effectively. The ship of the Swedish General-Admiral, which could not be brought into the wind due to a rigging problem, was forced to drift towards Rostislav and received major damage from grapeshot. The 64-gun battleship Prins Karl, fifteenth the Swedish line, lost her rudder to Russian fire and had to strike her colours.

The Duke of Södermanland directed the battle from the frigate Ulla Fersen, beyond the range of Russian fire. After a two-hour artillery duel he ordered his ships to break off the engagement; hence the last ten ships of Swedish line veered off without firing a shot. The Swedish ship Riksens Ständer hit the reef north of Aegna (Wolf) island. Swedish attempts to dislodge her failed, and the Swedes were forced to burn her so that the Russians would be unable to take her.

Aftermath

The Battle of Reval was a resounding Russian victory. The Swedes lost two ships of the line, and were forced to retreat despite their almost twofold numerical superiority. Swedish losses were 51 killed, 81 wounded, and 250 captured. Russian losses were 8 killed and 27 injured. Contemporary sources reported Russian casualties of 4 killed, 7 seriously and 18 lightly wounded, with almost 400 Swedish sailors, soldiers and officers captured and presumably 130 killed.

After the battle the Swedish fleet partially repaired at the sea, and then sailed away east of Hogland Island.

See also
 Reval order of battle

References 

Reval
Revel 1790
Reval, Battle of
Reval